The 38th World Cup season began in October 2003 in Sölden, Austria, and concluded at the World Cup finals in Sestriere, Italy, in March 2004.  Sestriere would host the alpine skiing events at the 2006 Winter Olympics.

Hermann Maier of Austria and Anja Pärson of Sweden won the overall titles.

Men

Race results 

Note:

At the World Cup finals in Sestriere only the best racers were allowed to compete and only the best 15 finishers were awarded with points.

Men's Overall Results

see complete table

Men's Downhill Results 

see complete table

In Men's Downhill World Cup 2003/04 all results count.  Stephan Eberharter won his third Downhill World Cup in a row.

Men's Super G Results 

see complete table

In Men's Super G World Cup 2003/04 all results count. Hermann Maier won his fifth Super G World Cup.  This record is still unbeaten.

Men's Giant Slalom Results 

see complete table

In Men's Giant Slalom World Cup 2003/04 all results count.

Men's Slalom Results 

see complete table

In Men's Slalom World Cup 2003/04 the all results count. Rainer Schönfelder won the cup with only one win.

Men's Combined Results 

see complete table

In Men's Combined World Cup 2003/04 both results count.

Women

Race results 

Note:

At the World Cup finals in Sestriere only the best racers were allowed to compete and only the best 15 finishers were awarded with points.

Women's Overall Results

see complete table

Women's Downhill Results

see complete table

In Women's Downhill World Cup 2003/04 all results count. Renate Götschl won her third Downhill World Cup.

Women's Super G Results

see complete table

In Women's Super G World Cup 2003/04 all results count.

Women's Giant Slalom Results

see complete table

In Women's Giant Slalom World Cup 2003/04 all results count.

Women's Slalom Results

see complete table

In Women's Slalom World Cup 2003/04 all results count.

Women's Combined Results

No competition was held.

External links
FIS-ski.com - World Cup standings - 2004

2003–04
World Cup
World Cup